Chah Gaz (also Romanized as Chāh Gaz; also known as Chāh Kaz) is a village in Hana Rural District, Abadeh Tashk District, Neyriz County, Fars Province, Iran. At the 2006 census, its population was 1,009, in 253 families.

References 

Populated places in Abadeh Tashk County